Porakkudi is a village in the Papanasam taluk of Thanjavur district, Tamil Nadu, India.

Demographics 

As per the 2001 census, Porakkudi had a total population of 906 with 455 males and 451 females. The sex ratio was 991. The literacy rate was 64.19.

References 

 

Villages in Thanjavur district